Chilonga is a town in Mpika District in the Muchinga Province of Zambia.

Location
The geographical coordinates of the town are: 12°01'28.0"S, 31°20'11.0"E (Latitude:-12.024444; Longitude:31.336389).

Overview
Chilonga lies on the Great North Road (T2 Road; Tanzam Highway), which is the main Highway that connects Lusaka, the capital of Zambia, to Kabwe, Kapiri Mposhi, Mpika, Isoka, Nakonde and on to Tunduma and Dar es Salaam, in neighboring Tanzania. Also, a tarmac highway links Chilonga to Mpika, Chandesi, Kasama and Mpulungu, at the southern tip of Lake Tanganyika.

The town is the location of Our Lady's Mission Hospital (Chilonga Mission Hospital), a Level 2 community hospital, with 182 beds, that serves the population of Mpika District, along with the smaller, government-owned, Level 1 Mpika District Hospital, in Mpika. Chilonga Mission Hospital was, as of April 2010, staffed by two doctors, two clinical officers, thirty-four nurses, five paramedics and seventy-two other support staff.

The Catholic Missionary Hospital at Chilonga, is home to the Chilonga School of Nursing and the Chilonga School of Midwifery. The total enrollment in both schools was about 150 students, as of October 2016.

Population
As of February 2006, the population of Chilonga was estimated at approximately 11,816 people.

See also
 TAZARA Railway
 Great North Road

References

External links
Chilonga Catholic Nursing School Gutted As of 7 October 2016.

Populated places in Muchinga Province